William Isaac C. Stott (16 April 1913 – third ¼ 1972) was an English professional rugby league footballer who played in the 1930s and 1940s.

Background
Billy Stott was born in Pontefract, West Riding of Yorkshire, England, he lived on a National Coal Board (NCB) housing estate at the top of Scotch Hill, off Girnhill Lane, Featherstone (now a Strata Homes development), and his death aged 59 was registered in Pontefract district, West Riding of Yorkshire, England.

Playing career

International honours
Billy Stott won a cap for England while at Broughton Rangers in the 2-3 defeat by Wales at Taff Vale Park, Pontypridd on Saturday 7 November 1936.

County honours
Billy Stott won a cap for Yorkshire while at Featherstone Rovers; during the 1933–34 season against Australia, and won a cap(s) for Yorkshire while at Broughton Rangers.

Challenge Cup Final appearances
Billy Stott played right-, i.e. number 3, was captain, scored 2-tries, a goal, and the winning penalty late in the match, and was named man of the match, winning the inaugural Lance Todd Trophy in Wakefield Trinity's 13-12 victory over Wigan in the 1946 Challenge Cup Final during the 1945–46 season at Wembley Stadium, London on Saturday 4 May 1946, in front of a crowd of 54,730.

County Cup Final appearances
Billy Stott played right-, i.e. number 3, and scored a goal in Wakefield Trinity's 2-5 defeat by Bradford Northern in the 1945 Yorkshire County Cup Final during the 1945–46 season at Thrum Hall, Halifax on Saturday 3 November 1945, and played right-, i.e. number 3, and scored a 2-goals in the 7–7 draw with Leeds in the 1947 Yorkshire County Cup Final during the 1947–48 season at Fartown Ground, Huddersfield on Saturday 1 November 1947, but did not play in the 8–7 victory over Leeds in the 1947 Yorkshire County Cup Final replay during the 1947–48 season at Odsal Stadium, Bradford on Wednesday 5 November 1947.

Club career
Billy Stott made his début for Featherstone Rovers on Saturday 29 March 1930, in 1933 he was transferred from Featherstone Rovers to Broughton Rangers for £750 (based on increases in average earnings, this would be approximately £137,700 in 2016), he appears to have scored no drop-goals (or field-goals as they are currently known in Australasia), but prior to the 1974–75 season all goals, whether; conversions, penalties, or drop-goals, scored 2-points, consequently prior to this date drop-goals were often not explicitly documented, therefore '0' drop-goals may indicate drop-goals not recorded, rather than no drop-goals scored. In addition, prior to the 1949–50 season, the archaic field-goal was also still a valid means of scoring points.

Genealogical information
Billy Stott's marriage to Rosanna (née Dutton) (birth registered during fourth ¼ 1912 in Pontefract district - death registered second ¼ 1953 (aged 40) in Pontefract district) was registered during third ¼ 1935 in Pontefract district, following the death of his first wife, Billy Stott's marriage to Edna (née Leeman) was registered during third ¼ 1958 in Pontefract district. Billy Stott was the brother of the rugby league footballer who played in the 1920s for Featherstone Rovers (Heritage № 21); Fred Stott.

References

External links
(archived by web.archive.org) Bradford win Yorkshire Cup
Billy Stott at marklaspalmas.blogspot.co.uk
Picture - Billy Stott **Dead Link**
Jimmy Breen (right) presenting autograph rugby ball to Billy Stott (left) in September 1946
Picture - Billy Stott
Jimmy Breen (right) presenting autograph rugby ball to Billy Stott (left) in September 1946
Picture Billy Stott wearing his All England Rugby Cap from 1936/37
Picture - W. Stott
Picture - Billy Stott wearing his All England Rugby Cap from 1936/37

1913 births
1972 deaths
Broughton Rangers players
England national rugby league team players
English rugby league players
Featherstone Rovers players
Lance Todd Trophy winners
Oldham R.L.F.C. players
Rugby league centres
Rugby league five-eighths
Rugby league players from Pontefract
Wakefield Trinity captains
Wakefield Trinity players
Yorkshire rugby league team players